Paulo César Turra (born 14 November 1973), known as Paulo Turra, is a Brazilian football coach and former player who played as a central defender. He is the current head coach of Athletico Paranaense.

Playing career
Born in Tuparendi, Rio Grande do Sul, Turra started playing football with local side Caxias, making his first team debut in 1991. In 1997, he moved on loan to Série A side Botafogo, but only featured rarely.

Back to Caxias, Turra helped his the side to win their first-ever Campeonato Gaúcho in 2000, under the management of Tite. On 5 July of that year, he joined Palmeiras in the top tier.

In July 2001, after winning the previous year's Copa dos Campeões and Copa Mercosur, Turra moved abroad and signed for Boavista in Portugal. He was runner-up of Primeira Liga once and played against young Cristiano Ronaldo, Sporting CP's player at that time; he also played for Boavista in a 2002–03 UEFA Cup semi-final against Celtic.

On 24 August 2004, Turra agreed to a one-year contract with Vitória de Guimarães, also in the Portuguese top tier. In January 2006, after falling down the pecking order, he went on a trial at Scottish side Hibernian, but nothing came of it.

In 2006, after his contract with Vitória expired, Turra returned to Brazil and joined Novo Hamburgo. Ahead of the 2007 season, he moved to Sertãozinho, but left the side for Avaí in March of that year.

Turra retired in December 2007, aged 34.

Coaching career
After retiring, Turra returned to Novo Hamburgo in 2008, as an assistant coach. On 27 February 2009, after head coach Gilmar Iser left for Juventude, he was named head coach of the club.

Turra was sacked on 26 October 2009, after a 4–1 loss to Brasil de Pelotas. The following January, he replaced Celso Freitas at the helm of Esportivo, but was dismissed on 8 March, with the club in an eight-match losing run.

On 15 November 2010, Turra was appointed Brusque manager for the upcoming season, but was relieved from his duties the following 14 February. He then worked at Brasil de Farroupilha before being named in charge of Cianorte on 23 November 2011.

Turra was sacked from Cianorte on 18 February 2013, after a poor start of the season. He then took over Paraná state side Operário Ferroviário late in the month, before being moved to Marcílio Dias with his technical staff in May, as the club was playing in the Série D.

After a failed move to Daegu FC in February 2014, Turra returned to Avaí on the 14th of that month, replacing Emerson Nunes. On 7 March, however, after only three matches, he was sacked.

On 15 October 2014, Turra was appointed head coach of another club he represented as a player, Caxias. He was dismissed on 12 March of the following year, and returned to Cianorte on 19 November 2015.

Turra left Cianorte on 2 December 2016, to join Luiz Felipe Scolari (his head coach during his playing days at Palmeiras) at Chinese club Guangzhou Evergrande, as his assistant. He followed Scolari under the same capacity in the following years, at Palmeiras, Cruzeiro, Grêmio and Athletico Paranaense.

On 13 November 2022, after Scolari announced his retirement from coaching and moved to a director role, Turra became the head coach of Athletico.

Managerial statistics

Honours

Player
Caxias
 Campeonato Gaúcho: 2000

Palmeiras
 Copa dos Campeões: 2000
 Copa Mercosur: 2000

Manager
Cianorte
Campeonato Paranaense Série Prata: 2016

References

1973 births
Living people
Sportspeople from Rio Grande do Sul
Brazilian footballers
Association football defenders
Campeonato Brasileiro Série A players
Campeonato Brasileiro Série B players
Primeira Liga players
Sociedade Esportiva e Recreativa Caxias do Sul players
Botafogo de Futebol e Regatas players
Sociedade Esportiva Palmeiras players
Boavista F.C. players
Vitória S.C. players
Esporte Clube Novo Hamburgo players
Sertãozinho Futebol Clube players
Avaí FC players
Brazilian expatriate footballers
Brazilian expatriate sportspeople in Portugal
Expatriate footballers in Portugal
Brazilian football managers
Campeonato Brasileiro Série B managers
Esporte Clube Novo Hamburgo managers
Clube Esportivo Bento Gonçalves managers
Grêmio Esportivo Glória managers
Brusque Futebol Clube managers
Sociedade Esportiva Recreativa e Cultural Brasil managers
Cianorte Futebol Clube managers
Operário Ferroviário Esporte Clube managers
Clube Náutico Marcílio Dias managers
Avaí FC managers
Sociedade Esportiva e Recreativa Caxias do Sul managers
Club Athletico Paranaense managers
Guangzhou F.C. non-playing staff
Brazilian expatriate sportspeople in China